Rostani is a rural locality (a village) in Piksimovskoye Rural Settlement, Vashkinsky District, Vologda Oblast, Russia. The population was 44 as of 2002.

Geography 
Rostani is located 38 km northwest of Lipin Bor (the district's administrative centre) by road. Isakovo is the nearest rural locality.

References 

Rural localities in Vashkinsky District